Bruce Lamont Branch (born September 14, 1978) is a former American football cornerback in the National Football League for the Washington Redskins.  He played college football at Penn State University.

Branch attended and played high school football at Huguenot High School in Richmond Virginia.

1978 births
Living people
American football cornerbacks
Penn State Nittany Lions football players
Players of American football from Richmond, Virginia
Sportspeople from Queens, New York
Players of American football from New York City
Jacksonville Jaguars players
Washington Redskins players
Barcelona Dragons players